Thunderdome is the ninth studio album by German hard rock band Pink Cream 69.

Track listing

European version (SPV Records 085-69442) omits tracks 13 & 14.
Limited edition digipack (SPV Records 087-69440) omits track 14.
Track 9 originally recorded by The Knack on the album Get the Knack.

Personnel
David Readman – vocals
Alfred Koffler – guitar
Dennis Ward – bass guitar
Kosta Zafiriou – drums
Gunther Werno – keyboards (Tracks 6 & 12)

Production
Mixing – Dennis Ward
Engineer – Dennis Ward

References

External links
Heavy Harmonies page

2004 albums
Pink Cream 69 albums
SPV/Steamhammer albums
Albums produced by Dennis Ward (musician)